Bridges of Sarajevo is a 2014 anthology film exploring Sarajevo present and past, directed by thirteen different directors. It was shown in the Special Screenings section of the 2014 Cannes Film Festival.

Creators
 Directors:
 Aida Begić (Bosnia and Herzegovina)
 Leonardo Di Costanzo (Italy)
 Jean-Luc Godard (Switzerland)
 Kamen Kalev (Bulgaria)
 Isild Le Besco (France)
 Sergei Loznitsa (Ukraine)
 Vincenzo Marra (Italy)
 Ursula Meier (Switzerland)
 Vladimir Perišić (Serbia)
 Cristi Puiu (Romania)
 Marc Recha (Spain)
 Angela Schanelec (Germany)
 Teresa Villaverde (Portugal)
 Artistic director: Jean-Michel Frodon
 Animation sequences: François Schuiten and Luís da Matta Almeida

Production
 Production: Cinétévé - Obala Art Centar.
 Co-production: Bande à part Films, Mir Cinematografica, Ukbar Filmes, Unafilm (and: France 2 Cinéma, Orange Studio, RAI Cinema, RTS Swiss Radio Television, Centenary's Mission of the First World War).

References

External links
 
 

2014 films
Anthology films
French documentary films
2010s French-language films
Bulgarian documentary films
German documentary films
Italian documentary films
Portuguese documentary films
Bosnia and Herzegovina documentary films
Films directed by Jean-Luc Godard
Films directed by Ursula Meier
Films directed by Cristi Puiu
Films directed by Marc Recha
Films directed by Angela Schanelec
Films directed by Sergei Loznitsa
Films set in Sarajevo
Films directed by Teresa Villaverde
Films directed by Kamen Kalev
Films directed by Vincenzo Marra
2010s French films
2010s German films